Christoforos Loizou (born 10 September 1969) is a Cypriot former footballer who played as a goalkeeper. He went on to work as a goalkeeping coach.

Loizou played for Omonia from 1985 to 1992, and finished his playing career with Olympiakos Nicosia. He began his coaching career with that club before returning to Omonia, also as goalkeeping coach, in 2006. He remained for nine years in total, in two spells either side of a season working with the Cyprus national team. He left Omonia in June 2016 and took up the post of goalkeeping coach with the Cyprus under-21 team later that year.

References

1969 births
Living people
Sportspeople from Nicosia
Cypriot footballers
Association football goalkeepers
AC Omonia players
Olympiakos Nicosia players